The 2015–16 Ligue 2 season was the 77th season since its establishment.

Teams

There are 20 clubs in the league, with three promoted teams from Championnat National replacing the three teams that were relegated to the same level, and three relegated teams from Ligue 1 replacing the three teams that were promoted to the same level. All clubs that secured Ligue 2 status for the season were subject to approval by the DNCG before becoming eligible to participate.

The first team to officially join the division for the 2015–16 was Lens, who were relegated from Ligue 1 on 2 May 2015 as results on the day went against them. They were joined a week later by Metz, after a 4–0 home defeat against Lorient. The last relegated club were Evian after a 2-1 defeat on 16 May 2015.

Red Star were the first team promoted from National, after a 4–0 victory against Istres on 8 May 2015, marking their return to the professional levels after sixteen years in the amateur leagues. Paris FC and Bourg-Péronnas only gained the right to promote on the last day of the season, when Paris FC drew 0–0 against CA Bastia and Bourg-Péronnas won 1–0 against Boulogne.

Only 2 teams were planned to be promoted and relegated this season but the decision was later overturned by an appeal to the Conseil d'État and the French Football Federation.

Stadia and locations

 1 Bourg-Péronnas original stadium, Stade Municipal de Péronnas, is not homologated to host professional matches. The club will play its home games in Bourg-en-Bresse at Stade Marcel-Verchère, home stadium of the Bressane rugby union team, after the stadium's renovation. Bourg-Péronnas will play its first games at Stade Jean Laville in Gueugnon.
 2 Red Star original stadium, Stade Bauer, is not homologated to host professional matches. The club will play its home games at Stade Pierre Brisson in Beauvais. Additionally, Red Star will host a number of games to be determined later at Stade de France in Saint-Denis.

Personnel and kits

1Subject to change during the season.

Managerial changes

League table

Results

Season statistics

Top goalscorers

Source: Official Goalscorers' Standings

Top assists

Source: Official Assists' Table

References

Ligue 2 seasons
2
Fra